Trowse (pronounced  by those from Norwich and  by elderly residents of the village), also called Trowse with Newton, is a village in South Norfolk which lies about  south-east of Norwich city centre on the banks of the River Yare. There are approved plans to build a further 770 houses on the outskirts of the village, at White Horse Lane and the Deal Ground sites.

History
Trowse is one of a small family of model villages in Great Britain.  As Bournville is to Birmingham, Port Sunlight to Liverpool, so Trowse is to Norwich.

Trowse was created (or more accurately expanded) by the Colman family during the 1800s for workers at Colman's mustard factory. The family still owns much of the surrounding land. It is also home to another great, old-established Norfolk family business – May Gurney – a major civil engineering and construction company which was acquired by Kier Group in 2013.

The parish is in the deanery of Brooke and the archdeaconry of Norfolk.

The parish church is a small flint building, in the Perpendicular style, comprising a chancel, nave, and square tower with a bell and a clock; the chancel was restored in 1879. The church is dedicated to St Andrew.

The parish formed part of the Henstead Hundred, until 1834 when the Hundred expanded to become the Henstead Union. Source: Kelly's Directory 1883 and 1927.

The name Trowse derives from the old English/Scottish word trouse, for a grating of wood or iron which could be raised or lowered (like a gate) to allow water out of a dam into a mill race (the original village grew up round the local water mill – now Trowse Millgate).

The Trowse village sign located opposite the church was presented to the parish in 1969 by the Women’s Institute to celebrate their Golden Jubilee, it saw a renovation project in 1999. 

Trouse (or Trews north of the border) was also the slang name for the leggings worn by Scots (since they too went up and down like a gate to allow water out) – and hence the word Trouser. Source: Kelly's Directory 1883, Oxford companion to place names, English Gazetteer and others.

National Grid ref: TG2406

Today
The village of Trowse forms the main part of the parish of Trowse with Newton.

Trowse consists of six parts:
 Trowse Common, the main village, clustered around the Common;
 Crown Point, the high ground round the historic Crown Point pub, site of the original Newton and where the new Hopkins Homes estate was built in 2003;
 Trowse Millgate, around the River Yare, half of which is in the City of Norwich;
 Trowse Magna, the name given to the gated development at Whitlingham Hall (a former hospital);
 New Newton, an extension to the village, centred on Newton Close, built in 1968 to accommodate police from the newly built County Hall;
 Nether Trowse, the area at the far end of Whitlingham Lane, which was once recognised as the hamlet of Whitlingham (until the church burnt down and the tower collapsed).

The original Newton, of Trowse with Newton, was the row of cottages on Block Hill behind the Crown Point pub, which was the model village (or new town) built by the Colman family for workers in its mustard factory at Trowse Millgate.  Some of the properties still have the tell-tale mustard yellow front doors.

The Crown Point pub takes its name from the Crown Point estate, of which it was originally part, which centred on Crown Point Hall (now called Whitlingham Hall), which was originally built by General Money who fought at the battle of Crown Point during the American War of Independence.

The parish of Trowse with Newton also covers some of the civil parishes of Whitlingham and Bixley.

The River Tas joins the River Yare a short distance to the west of the Trowse Mill at an artificially created confluence, however, the old bed of the River Tas can still be seen by the church but it just ebbs and flows with the tide and is gradually silting up. The mill was demolished in 1967; what can be seen today was built recently in a style and layout remarkably sympathetic to the old mill.

Since the building of the Norwich southern bypass and associated Trowse bypass in 1992 the village, which was once divided by the A146, has now regained its rural character.  The village is still growing, with a recent development of 60 houses at the top of the village on the site of the former training ground of the Norwich City Football Club, and there are proposals to develop the village further, although potential developments are largely opposed by locals as they are concerned that over development will spoil the character of the village.  The village is also opposed to being part of the proposed expanded Norwich, with 99% of those who voted in a referendum in 2008 against being part of a Greater Norwich.

Facilities
The village is well endowed with leisure facilities with a sports hall, astroturf football pitch, dry ski slope, two broads in adjacent Whitlingham (one a conservation lake, the other for water based leisure activities), woodland walks, riverside picnic areas along Whitlingham Lane, and a common right in the centre.

There are two pubs, the White Horse Inn and the Crown Point Tavern; a village shop and a vegetarian café.

Transport links

Road
Now bypassed by the A146 most links are now through Norwich itself, Trowse being reached by a spur from the Martineau Lane roundabout on the Norwich Ring Road.

Rail
Although lying on the Great Eastern Main Line between Norwich and London, Trowse railway station was closed on the outbreak of World War II. It was used briefly during 1986 when Norwich station was closed in preparation for electrification.

Bus
Trowse lies on several bus routes providing a service every 10 minutes into Norwich, every 15 minutes to Poringland, a half-hourly service to Stoke Holy Cross and an hourly service to Bungay and Brooke.

Bicycle
National Cycle Route 1 passes through Trowse on its way out of Norwich to Loddon and Beccles passing along Whitlingham Lane. A cycle route is also provided across the Norwich southern bypass to link with Poringland and Kirby Bedon.

Notes

External links

Trowse Community Web Site
Trowse with Newton Parish Council
Images of Trowse on Geograph
Trowse Church
Trowse Mill
Trowse image gallery
Norfolk Ski Club
The White Horse Public House
May Gurney
Jason Middleton Photographer
Whitlingham Adventure

South Norfolk
Villages in Norfolk
Model villages
Civil parishes in Norfolk